Embakasi West is a constituency in Nairobi. It is one of seventeen constituencies in Nairobi County. Most of the area that forms Embakasi West Constituency was part of Embakasi Constituency; though some of its areas were part of Kamukunji Constituency. Embakasi West includes four electoral wards: Umoja I, Umoja II, Mowlem, and Kariobangi South.

References 

Constituencies in Nairobi